The 1876 Michigan gubernatorial election was held on November 7, 1876. Republican nominee Charles Croswell defeated Democratic nominee William L. Webber with 52.39% of the vote.

General election

Candidates
Major party candidates
Charles Croswell, Republican
William L. Webber, Democratic
Other candidates
Levi Sparks, Greenback

Results

References

1876
Michigan
Gubernatorial
November 1876 events